Buzzgrinder.com was one of the longest-running MP3 blogs online. It was started in July 2001 in eastern Pennsylvania, United States, and is now based in Louisville, Kentucky.

Notable stories
In addition to offering "music news + useless opinion" for nearly a decade, Buzzgrinder has broken several heavily reported stories over the years, including Jim Ward's refusal to do an At the Drive-in reunion, rumors of Ted Leo's retirement, Across Five Aprils' album leak hoax, and the confirmation of Guided by Voices' 2010 reunion tour, among others.

Concert promotion
Buzzgrinder has also promoted several concerts with notable acts such as Rival Schools, Matt and Kim, Deftones, High on Fire, Torche, mewithoutYou, J Mascis' Sweet Apple, J Roddy Walston and the Business, and The Henry Clay People.

References

External links 
 

American music websites
Music blogs
Internet properties established in 2001